Paper Port (Spanish: Puerto Papel) is a 2016 animated television series produced by Zumbastico Studios. The series blends stop-motion and 2D animation with papercraft characters and environments, in a technique called Papermotion.

The series was co-produced by the channels Televisión Nacional de Chile (Chile), Pakapaka (Argentina), Gloob (Brazil), and Señal Colombia. Additionally, it's also produced by Pipeline Studios in Canada and distributed by Millimages in France. It first aired in 2016. It also airs on Discovery Kids (Latin America).  Paper Port's season 2 is in production, as well as a movie.

Plot
Matilde, a 12-year-old girl, spends her vacations at her grandfather's house in the seaside city of Paper Port. After finding a magic coconut she wakes up every day with a mysterious new power, which she has to deal with in each episode, together with her friends Carlos, Ferni, and Boldo.

Characters

Cast

Spanish cast
Carolina Ayala - Matilde
Andrea Fröhlich - Carlos
Orlando Noguera - Barbacrespa and   Jefe Astudillo
Fabián Hernández - Mortimer
Paula Barros - Ferni
Jonathan Ramírez - Boldo
Alejandro Toro - Tropecio Ferguson

Portuguese cast

Matilde by Flávia Saddy
Carlos by Luciano Monteiro
Barbacrespa by Júlio Chaves
Mortimer by Ricardo Schnetzer
Ferni by Luiza Cezar
Boldo by Renan Freitas
Chefe Haroldo by Mário Jorge de Andrade
Tropécio by Philippe Maia
Menino Pirulito by Arthur Salerno

English cast

Cristina Vee or Kara Eberle - Matilda (Matilde)
Bryce Papenbrook - Charlie (Carlos)

Reception

International Broadcast

Episodes

Season 1 (2015-2016)

Season 2 (2018)

References

External links 

 Official site
 Paper Port at Zumbástico Studios
 

2010s Brazilian animated television series
2016 animated television series debuts
Argentine children's animated adventure television series
Argentine children's animated comedy television series
Argentine children's animated fantasy television series
Brazilian children's animated adventure television series
Brazilian children's animated comedy television series
Brazilian children's animated fantasy television series
Chilean children's animated adventure television series
Chilean children's animated comedy television series
Chilean children's animated fantasy television series
Chilean animated television series
Colombian children's animated adventure television series
Colombian children's animated comedy television series
Colombian children's animated fantasy television series
Stop-motion animated television series
Animated television series about children
Television series about vacationing
Anime-influenced Western animated television series